Blair Allison is a Canadian ice hockey former coach and goaltender who was an All-American for Maine.

Career
Allison started his college career at the University of Maine in 1992 as a reserve goaltender, just in time to watch the team win its first national championship. With both starting goaltenders turning pro after the season, Allison was able to earn the job as the team's primary starter in his sophomore season. With many other players also having left, the team declined in the standings but still finished with a respectable record. Unfortunately, near the end of the regular season, Maine was forced to forfeit several games for using an ineligible player. The retroactive losses dropped the Black Bears to the bottom of the Hockey East standings and caused Maine to come up against top-seeded Boston University in the conference quarterfinals. Not surprisingly, Maine was knocked out in the first round. While the team only officially won 6 games during the year, Allison had not played a part in the violation and was allowed to keep his record of 11–8–3.

Maine was able to put the infractions in the past the next season and got off to a fantastic start. With Allison acting like a wall in the crease, Maine didn't lose until its 20th game and went on to tie for the league lead. Allison set a program record by winning 32 games and played in 51 consecutive matches when all was said and done. He was named as a first team All-American and helped the Black Bears return to the NCAA tournament. Maine received a bye into the quarterfinal round and won their opening match against 6th-seeded Denver. In the Frozen Four, they had to face the top western seed, Michigan. The two produced one of the most memorable games in NCAA history, slugging it out for over 100 minutes of playing time. Allison made 47 saves in the triple-overtime classic and allowed Dan Shermerhorn to score the winning goal in what was then the longest game in NCAA tournament history. Allison felt his team was fortunate to survive the game but they did advance to the championship game for a showdown against rival BU. Allison played well in the final game but penalties cost Maine early as BU built a 3–0 lead in the first 30 minutes. The Black Bears were able to close the gap to within 1 early in the third period but were only able to capitalize on one of eight man-advantages while BU went three for four on the power play and closed out the game with the last three goals. Despite the sour end, Allison was named as the top goaltender of the tournament.

Hopes were high for Allison's third season as he was widely viewed as one of the top goaltender in the nation and was expected to give Maine another shot at a championship. Both Allison and the team, however, took a step back in 1996 and the Black Bears finished third in the Hockey East standings. With the team on the bubble of the NCAA tournament, Allison led the Black Bears to the conference championship game were they were met by 4th-place Providence. The meeting was unfortunate as Maine have could conceivably received an at-large bid if they lost to top seeded BU; were Providence to win, however, Maine would likely be knocked out of the tournament. As it turned out, that's exactly what happened. The Friars won the title with a 3–2 victory, earning the conference's automatic bid, while the two team ahead of Maine in the standings were selected for the tournament while the Black Bears were left out.

After graduating, Allison joined the Canadian national team in the run up to the 1998 Olympic Games. While Allison had little chance to make the team since professional players were now allowed to participate, he was able to parley the opportunity into a professional career. Allison spent most of the next 9 years playing minor league hockey, mostly at the AA-level, but did produce fairly impressive records. He spent two years with the Tacoma Sabercats, backstopping the team to a championship in 1999 and a runner up finish the following year. After a year in the UHL, Allison returned to the west, this time with the Idaho Steelheads and was again a stalwart in goal. He helped the team win the Kelly Cup in 2004 after several programs were absorbed into the ECHL. Allison tried his hand at coaching the following year but didn't stay behind the bench for long. He ended his playing career with 4 games spread out over a three-year period ending in 2007.

Statistics

Regular season and playoffs

Awards and honors

References

External links

1972 births
Living people
AHCA Division I men's ice hockey All-Americans
Canadian ice hockey goaltenders
Ice hockey people from British Columbia
People from the Columbia-Shuswap Regional District
Maine Black Bears men's ice hockey players
Orlando Solar Bears (IHL) players
Tallahassee Tiger Sharks players
Jacksonville Lizard Kings players
Tacoma Sabercats players
New Haven Knights players
Springfield Falcons players
Idaho Steelheads (WCHL) players
Idaho Steelheads (ECHL) players